The Meteora is a rock formation and important complex of Eastern Orthodox monasteries in Thessaly, Greece.

Meteora may also refer to:
 Meteora (municipality), a municipality in Thessaly, Greece
 Meteora (album), a 2003 album by Linkin Park
 Meteora (film), a 2012 film by Spiros Stathoulopoulos
 Meteora (horse), a racehorse
 Meteora sporadica, a free-living protozoan
 Meteora (wrestling), a professional wrestling attack
 Meteora: The Unchained Goddess, a 1958 film in the Bell Laboratory Science Series
 Meteora Österreich, a character from 2017 anime series Re:Creators
 Meteorology (Aristotle), a philosophical treatise by Aristotle